Life in the Trenches is a compilation album by Swedish indie pop band The Embassy, released on 27 September 2011 by Service. The album consists of singles and non-album tracks recorded from 2001 to 2011.

The album's cover was designed by Linnea Rygaard.

Track listing

Charts

References

2011 compilation albums